Venice of America may refer to the following places:

 Original name of Venice, Los Angeles and the Venice Canal Historic District, in California
 Nickname of Fort Lauderdale, Florida
 Nickname of Holyoke, Massachusetts, particularly its downtown, which contains the Holyoke Canal System
 Nickname of Lowell, Massachusetts
 Nickname of Recife, Brazil, also called "Brazilian Venice"